Farm to Market Roads in Texas are owned and maintained by the Texas Department of Transportation (TxDOT).

FM 500

Farm to Market Road 500 (FM 500) is located in San Saba County. It runs from SH 16 north of San Saba to FM 45 north of Richland Springs.

FM 500 was designated on July 13, 1945, from SH 16 northwestward  to Fairview. It was extended northwest twice: a  extension on November 23, 1948, and a  extension on September 29, 1954. On August 24, 1955, it was extended to the west to FM 45, replacing FM 1479.

RM 501

Ranch to Market Road 501 (RM 501) is located in Mason and San Saba counties. Its western terminus is at SH 71 in Pontotoc. It travels to the north before turning to the east toward Cherokee, where it crosses SH 16.

RM 501 was authorized on July 13, 1945, as Farm to Market Road 501 (FM 501), a  road between SH 16 in Cherokee and the Salt Branch Road in San Saba County. On November 29, 1957, FM 501 was extended west to Pontotoc, replacing FM 1648; at this time, the designation was changed from FM 501 to RM 501. On October 31, 1958, RM 501 was extended eastward . On September 27, 1960, it was extended to its junction with FM 580.

FM 502

Farm to Market Road 502 (FM 502) is located in McCulloch and San Saba counties.

FM 502 was designated on July 14, 1945, from US 377 southeast and east  to the Milburn Road. On September 24, 1954, FM 502 was extended east to the end of FM 2048 at the McCulloch–San Saba county line. Later that day, FM 2048 was cancelled and combined with FM 502.

FM 503

Farm to Market Road 503 (FM 503) is located in McCulloch and Coleman counties. It runs from US 87 northwest of Melvin to a point north of SH 153 northwest of Coleman.

On November 23, 1948, the FM 503 designation was extended  miles to the north, to Doole. On November 21, 1956, the route was extended northward  to Stacy. On September 27, 1960, the road was extended north to the McCulloch-Coleman County Line. A northward extension on October 14, 1960, connected FM 503 to US 67, as a replacement for FM 566. On May 6, 1964, FM 503 was extended north to FM 53 (now SH 153). On May 7, 1974, FM 503 was extended north  to its current terminus.

FM 504

Farm to Market Road 504 (FM 504) is located in McCulloch County.

On July 21, 1949, FM 504 was extended west . On May 23, 1951, FM 504 was extended west  through Pear Valley to a road intersection. On November 20, 1951, FM 504 was extended west . On December 17, 1952, FM 504 was extended west  miles to FM 503.

RM 505

Ranch to Market Road 505 (RM 505) lies entirely within Jeff Davis County in the Trans-Pecos region of far West Texas.

FM 506

FM 507

Farm to Market Road 507 (FM 507) is located in Cameron and Willacy counties. It runs from Business US 77 to FM 498.

FM 507 was designated on July 3, 1945, from FM 106 northeast of Harlingen north  to the Combes/Rio Hondo Road (later FM 508). On February 6, 1953, a break was added at FM 508. On October 31, 1957, the road was extended north  to FM 1018. On August 28, 1958, the northern terminus was moved to FM 498, forming a continuous route with FM 2374; FM 508 was extended over FM 2374 on September 12, 1958, replacing it. On July 1, 1959, the road was extended south  over former FM 106 to US 77 (later Loop 448, now Business US 77). On June 27, 1995, the section from FM 508 to Business US 77 was transferred to UR 507, but this was changed back to FM 507 on November 15, 2018.

FM 508

Farm to Market Road 508 (FM 508) is located in Cameron County. It runs from I-69E/US 77 at Combes to FM 106 west of Rio Hondo.

This concurrency was removed on February 6, 1953, when this section was transferred to FM 508. On May 21, 1979, a 0.3 mile section from Loop 448 (now Business US 77) to US 77 was transferred to SH 107.

FM 509

Farm to Market Road 509 (FM 509) is located in Cameron County. It runs from FM 508 to a Border State Inspection Facility near the Mexico border.

FM 509 was designated on July 3, 1945, from US 83 south of Harlingen to Rangerville and southeast to Sam Houston Boulevard, but the route was corrected to end at FM 675. On April 26, 1989, the road was extended south  to the GSA complex at the Los Indios International Bridge, although this section was not officially designated until April 5, 1992, replacing FM 3380. On December 21, 1994, the road was extended north to FM 508, replacing Loop 590 and creating a concurrency with FM 1595. On June 27, 1995, the section from FM 1595 to US 77 was transferred to UR 509. On November 20, 2014, the road was extended east 0.4 mile to a then-proposed Border State Inspection Facility. On November 15, 2018, UR 509 was changed back to FM 509.

FM 510

FM 511

Farm to Market Road 511 (FM 511) is located in Cameron County. It runs from FM 3248 on the northeast side of Brownsville southeast and southward to the city's southern sections. The highway forms an outer loop/bypass of the main portion of Brownsville. It is known locally and is signed as the Senator Eddie Lucio Jr. Highway.

FM 511 was originally designated on July 3, 1945, from US 83 in Olmito to SH 4 near the Port of Brownsville. On September 9, 1947, it was extended on the north side to include a  section to US 281 near Olmito, and on the south side to extend southward and westward  into Brownsville. On November 23, 1948, it extended to SH 4 in Brownsville. On October 7, 1949, the section south of FM 1419 was transferred to FM 1419. On January 29, 1957, this section west of Olmito was renumbered FM 1732. On August 26, 1969, FM 511 was relocated at Port of Brownsville.

The highway formerly extended northwest to I-69E and US 77/US 83 at Olmito, but this portion was expanded starting in 2008 and was transferred to SH 550. The section from FM 3248 south to SH 48 was a part of this expansion, becoming a four-lane highway with center turning lane. This project began in January 2008 and was completed late in 2010.

On June 27, 1995, the section from FM 3248 to FM 1419 was designated Urban Road 511 (UR 511). The designation reverted to FM 511 with the elimination of the Urban Road system on November 15, 2018.

FM 512

FM 513

Farm to Market Road 513 (FM 513) is located in Hunt and Rains counties.

FM 513 was designated on June 25, 1945, from SH 24 (now SH 224) in Commerce via Campbell to US 69 in Lone Oak. On November 23, 1948, FM 513 was extended south . On December 15, 1954, FM 513 was extended south to FM 35 (now SH 276), replacing FM 1974. On August 28, 1958, one section was transferred to Spur 178. On May 1, 1965, the section from FM 819 to Spur 178 was transferred to the new SH 50, as well as FM 819 itself.

FM 514

FM 515

FM 516

FM 517

Farm to Market Road 517 (FM 517) is located in Brazoria and Galveston counties. It runs from SH 6 in Alvin to FM 146.

FM 517 was designated on July 9, 1945, from US 75 at Dickinson east to SH 146 at San Leon, and US 75 at Dickinson west to the Brazoria County line. The Dickinson-Brazoria County line portion was cancelled on January 18, 1946, and the road was extended west to Alta Loma on July 20, 1948. On December 17, 1952, the road was extended west to SH 6, and a 4.8-mile section of FM 517 was transferred to FM 646 (this portion was originally planned as FM 520). On October 28, 1953, the road was extended northeast to Edwards Point. On September 21, 1955, the road was extended west from Edwards Point to SH 146, and then west and south via Bacliff to FM 517 on May 2, 1962, creating a loop route. The FM 3436-FM 517 portion was transferred to FM 3436 (partially now FM 646) on January 28, 1982. On June 27, 1995, when the UR 646-San Leon portion was transferred to UR 517, but on November 15, 2018, UR 517 became part of FM 517 again.

FM 518

Farm to Market Road 518 (FM 518) is located in Brazoria and Galveston counties. It runs from SH 288 to SH 146/future SH 99.

FM 518 was designated on June 21, 1945, from US 59 (now Alt. US 90) on the south side of Houston south to the Brazoria County line. On July 9, 1945, the road was extended south and east to Kemah via Pearland and League City, but the US 75-Brazoria County line portion was cancelled on January 18, 1946, creating a gap. This gap was closed on January 27, 1949, when the section from League City to the Brazoria County line was restored. On January 16, 1968, the eastern terminus was relocated and FM 518 was rerouted, replacing a portion of FM 1266. The old route was renumbered FM 2094. On September 13, 1984, the Alt. US 90-FM 518 portion was transferred to FM 865 and FM 518 was rerouted over FM 3344, which was cancelled. On June 30, 1995, the entire route was transferred to UR 518, but on November 15, 2018, the route was changed back to FM 518. Retail construction between FM 518 and FM 521 in Pearland is coming soon in the near future.

FM 519

Farm to Market Road 519 (FM 519) is located in Galveston County. It runs from SH 6 in Hitchcock to Spur 197 in Texas City.

FM 519 was designated on July 9, 1945, from Hitchcock to US 75 near La Marque. On November 29, 1990, the road was extended east to Loop 197 (now Spur 197), replacing SH 341. On June 17, 1995, the entire route was transferred to Urban Road 519 (UR 519). The designation reverted to FM 519 with the elimination of the Urban Road system on November 15, 2018.

FM 520

Farm to Market Road 520 (FM 520) is located in Hansford and Sherman counties. It runs from SH 207 near Spearman to FM 1060.

FM 520 was designated on May 23, 1951, from SH 117 (renumbered SH 15 on October 26, 1954, this portion of SH 15 transferred to SH 207 on September 1, 1965) west to McKibben. SH 117 was renumbered SH 15 on October 26, 1954. On September 21, 1955, FM 520 was extended west to FM 278 (this section transferred to SH 136 on November 21, 1963). On May 25, 1976, FM 520 was extended west to FM 1060, completing its current length.

FM 520 (1945)

The first FM 520 was designated on July 9, 1945, from SH 6 at Alta Loma north to FM 517 between Dickinson and Alvin. The route was cancelled on January 18, 1946. FM 517 (now FM 646) was routed over FM 520 in 1948.

FM 521

Farm to Market Road 521 (FM 521) is located in Southeast Texas. It runs from US 90A in Houston as Almeda Road to SH 35 near Palacios. At nearly 95 miles, FM 521 is one of the longest farm-to-market roads in Texas.

FM 521 was designated on July 9, 1945, from SH 36 in Brazoria to SH 35 at Bailey's Prairie. On January 16, 1953, the road was extended southwest and west to SH 60 in Wadsworth, replacing FM 1090, FM 1469 and a portion of FM 524. On October 15, 1954, the road was extended to SH 35 near Palacios, replacing FM 460 and FM 1096. A month later the road was extended northeast to SH 288 (now BS 288-B). On September 21, 1955, the road was rerouted around Wadsworth; the old route was redesignated FM 2078. On October 24, 1956, a 1.3-mile section of FM 521 from Brazoria northeastward was transferred to SH 332. On December 14, 1981, the road was extended over a former routing of SH 288 to US 90A in Houston. The final change came on June 27, 1995, when the UR 2234-US 90A portion was transferred to UR 521. This portion was changed back to FM 521 on November 15, 2018.

FM 522

Farm to Market Road 522 (FM 522) is located in Brazoria County. It runs from SH 36 near West Columbia to FM 1459.

FM 522 was designated on July 9, 1945, from SH 36, 2 miles southeast of West Columbia to Blacks Ferry. The only change to the route was on May 2, 1962, when the road was extended southwest to FM 1459.

FM 523

Farm to Market Road 523  (FM 523) is located in Brazoria County. it runs from SH 288 in Freeport to FM 521.
FM 523 was designated on July 9, 1945, from SH 288 in Freeport to Stratton Ridge. On July 22, 1949, FM 523 was extended to SH 35, replacing FM 1091. On December 4, 1961, the northern terminus in Angleton was relocated. On May 23, 1983, the old location of FM 523 via Downing Street was given to the city of Angleton. On September 29, 1992, FM 523 was extended to FM 521, replacing Loop 558 and FM 3507.

FM 524

Farm to Market Road 524 (FM 524) is located in Brazoria County. It runs from FM 1301 near West Columbia to FM 521.

FM 524 was designated on July 9, 1945, from Brazoria via Sweeny to SH 35. On January 16, 1953, a 6.1-mile section of FM 524 was transferred to FM 521. On June 9, 1958, a section from FM 1301 to SH 35 was added, replacing FM 1089. The final change was on April 29, 2012, when the road was rerouted around the ConocoPhillips facility northwest of Sweeny due to security concerns.

FM 525

Farm to Market Road 525 (FM 525) is located in Harris County. It runs from I-45 west to I-69/US 59 on the north side of Houston. The road is known locally as Aldine-Bender Road.

FM 525 was designated on June 21, 1945, from US 59, 10 miles north of Houston, west to US 75 (now I-45). On March 1, 1961, the eastern terminus was relocated south to link up with a proposed interchange at Lee Road and US 59. On June 30, 1995, the entire route was transferred to UR 525. The final change was on May 29, 2014, when FM 525 was rerouted back to its 1945 configuration, while the old route following Lee Road was redesignated FM Spur 525 (FS 525). FM 525 was also extended east 0.3 mile to Marine Road. On November 15, 2018, the route was changed back to FM 525.

FM 526

Farm to Market Road 526 (FM 526) is located in Harris County.

FM 526 begins at an interchange with I-10 in Houston, heading northwest on Federal Road, then curves north to become Maxey Road. FM 526 reaches an interchange with the US 90 freeway, where it merges into the frontage roads of that highway. FM 526 splits from US 90 by heading north on South Lake Houston Parkway. It then turns northwest before ending at Business US 90.

FM 526 was designated on June 21, 1941, as a spur from US 90 northeast of Houston south  to the Market Street Road. On November 19, 1952, the road was rerouted to end at SH 73 (now I-10). On September 18, 1961, the northern terminus was relocated to a new alignment of US 90, replacing FM 2613. The old route is now Oates Road. On June 27, 1995, the designation was changed to Urban Road 526 (UR 526). The designation reverted to FM 526 with the elimination of the Urban Road system on November 15, 2018.

FM 527

Farm to Market Road 527 (FM 527) was located in Harris County. There is no highway currently using the FM 527 designation.

FM 527 was designated on June 21, 1945, from US 90 northeast of Houston, west and north  to a point near Dyersdale. This route followed what is now Liberty Road, Houston Road, Fields Street and Mesa Drive. On November 1, 1967, the southern terminus was relocated and FM 527 followed Mesa Drive for the entire route. By district request, FM 527 was canceled on August 23, 1991, and removed from the highway system; the portion from US 90 to the north Houston city limits was returned to the city of Houston; the remaining portion was returned to Harris County.

FM 528

Farm to Market Road 528 (FM 528) is located in Harris, Galveston and Brazoria counties. It runs from Business SH 35 in Alvin northeast to I-45 in Webster.

FM 528 was designated on June 21, 1945, from US 75 (now I-45) east to SH 146 at Seabrook. On December 17, 1952, the road was extended west to FM 518. On January 16, 1953, the road was extended west to SH 35 (later Loop 409; now Business SH 35) north of Alvin, replacing FM 1461. The section from I-45 east to SH 146 was transferred to NASA Road 1 on January 27, 1965. On June 27, 1995, the entire route was redesignated Urban Road 528 (UR 528). On March 25, 2010, the designation was extended southwest to SH 6, however this section remains unbuilt. The designation of the route reverted to FM 528 with the elimination of the Urban Road system on November 15, 2018.

Junction list

FM 529

Farm to Market Road 529 (FM 529) is located in Austin, Waller, and Harris counties. It runs from US 290 near Houston to SH 159 in Bellville.

On June 28, 1963, it was extended west to the Waller County line. On May 6, 1964, the road was again extended west to FM 362. On June 1, 1965, a section from FM 362 west to FM 331 was added. On April 6, 1970, the road was extended to SH 159 at Bellville, replacing a section of FM 331. The final change was on June 27, 1995, when the US 290–SH 99 portion was transferred to UR 529. This portion was changed back to FM 529 on November 15, 2018.

Junction list

FM 530

Farm to Market Road 530 (FM 530) is located in Lavaca and Jackson counties. It runs from US 90A to Future I-69/US 59 northeast of Edna.

FM 530 was designated on July 9, 1945, from US 90A (then SH 200) southeast  toward Vienna. On August 26, 1948, FM 530 was extended southeast  to Vienna. On January 27, 1950, the road extended southeast . On May 23, 1951, the road extended southeast  to a road intersection. On November 20, 1951, the road extended southeast to the Lavaca-Jackson County line. On January 16, 1953, FM 530 was extended southeast to US 59, replacing FM 719. On July 25, 1960, the northern terminus of FM 530 was relocated.

FM 531

Farm to Market Road 531 (FM 531) is located in Lavaca County. It runs from US 90A to Ezzell.

FM 531 was designated on July 9, 1945, from what was then Spur 27 at Sweet Home to Koerth. On November 20, 1946, the road was extended to three miles north of US 77, replacing Spur 27 and FM 534. The final change was on July 14, 1949, when the road was extended northwest to SH 200 (now US 90A) and east to its current end, replacing FM 959.

FM 532

FM 533

FM 534

FM 534 (1945)

The first FM 534 was designated on July 9, 1945, from US 77 at Spur 27 north three miles. FM 534 was cancelled on November 20, 1946, and became a portion of FM 531.

FM 535

Farm to Market Road 535 (FM 535) is a  route located in Bastrop County.

FM 535 begins at the Bastrop/Travis County Line. From there, it proceeds southeast through the communities of Cedar Creek and Rockne to SH 304 near Rosanky. The road then takes a northeasterly turn to its terminus at SH 95 just south of Smithville.

FM 535 was designated from SH 95 at Smithville to Rosanky on July 9, 1945. On November 23, 1948, it was extended to FM 20 at Rockne. FM 535 was extended to SH 21 at Cedar Creek on September 29, 1954, and to the Bastrop County line on October 29, 1992.

Junction list

FM 536

Farm to Market Road 536 (FM 536) is located in Atascosa and Wilson counties. Its western terminus is at US 281 in Espey. It crosses I-37 at that route's exit 117. Its eastern terminus is at US 181 and SH 97 in Floresville.

FM 536 was designated on July 9, 1945, from SH 97 (now Loop 181) in Floresville west  toward Fairview. On December 16, 1948, FM 536 was extended west  to Fairview. On December 17, 1952, FM 536 was extended west to US 281, replacing FM 1892. On October 23, 1965, FM 536 was extended east to US 181 and SH 97, completing its current route.

FM 537

FM 538

FM 539

FM 540

FM 540 (1945)

The first FM 540 was designated on July 9, 1945, from SH 123 near the Guadalupe County line 3.5 miles towards Swift School. FM 540 was cancelled on November 21, 1956, and combined with FM 1681.

FM 541

FM 542

FM 543

Farm to Market Road 543 (FM 543) is located in Collin County. It runs from FM 455 at Weston to CR 206.

On January 29, 1953, an  section was transferred to FM 455. On October 26, 1954, the road was extended south 2.7 miles to US 75 (now SH 5). On December 16, 2013; a 1.5 mile section from US 75 to CR 206 was removed altogether and the section from 7.6 miles CR 206 to FM 455 was redesignated as Spur 195, but this was changed back to FM 543 on September 26, 2016, and the section from US 75 to SH 5 was redesignated as Spur 195.

FM 544

Farm to Market Road 544 (FM 544), known for most of its length as Parker Road, is located in Collin County. It runs from SH 121 eastward to west Plano city limits, and from east Plano city limits to SH 78. FM 544 passes through the cities of Plano, Murphy, and Wylie within Denton and Collin counties. The segment of FM 544 in Plano follows Parker Road, Plano Parkway, Charles Street, Hebron Parkway, Park Boulevard, Coit Road, 15th Street, G Avenue, and 14th Street.

FM 544 was designated on July 9, 1945, from SH 78 at Wylie to Plano. On November 23, 1948, FM 544 was extended west to SH 289 at Shepton. On November 20, 1951, FM 544 was extended west to SH 121, replacing FM 1383. On November 24, 1959, FM 544 was extended south to the Dallas County Line. On January 6, 1978, the section from FM 544 from FM 3412 south to existing FM 544 was transferred to FM 1378, and the section of FM 544 from FM 1378 to SH 78 was renumbered as FM 3412. The old FM 3412 became a rerouting of FM 544. On October 28, 1987, the section of FM 544 in Plano was given to the city of Plano, creating a gap in the highway. On July 28, 1994, FM 544 was extended west from old SH 121 (now FM 2281) to current SH 121. On June 27, 1995, FM 544 was redesignated Urban Road 544 (UR 544). On August 31, 2000, the section of FM 544 from SH 78 to the Dallas County line was removed from the state highway system and given to the city of Wylie. The designation of the remaining segment reverted to FM 544 with the elimination of the Urban Road system on November 15, 2018.

Junction list

FM 545

FM 546

FM 547

Farm to Market Road 547 (FM 547) is located in Collin County.

FM 547 begins at an intersection with FM 6 in Nevada. The highway runs north along Moore Street to County Road 850 and turns to the west. FM 547 runs west until FM 1778 and turns back to the north. FM 547 ends at an intersection with US 380 just east of Farmersville.

FM 547 was designated on July 9, 1945, on its current route.

FM 548

Farm to Market Road 548 (FM 548) is located in the eastern portion of the Dallas-Fort Worth metroplex.

FM 548 begins at an intersection with FM 740 just south of Forney. FM 548 travels northeast for about  before intersecting FM 741, near Forney High School. At the intersection with FM 1641, FM 548 runs in a more north–south direction, intersecting with FM 688 and US 80. The highway turns back to the northeast at Marketplace Drive, the location of a major shopping center in the town. Leaving Forney, FM 548 travels by many subdivisions before taking a more rural route.

Entering Rockwall County, the highway enters the town of McLendon-Chisholm. In the community, FM 548 shares a short overlap with SH 205. Exiting the town, the highway continues to run in a northeast direction, before making a nearly 90-degree turn to the northwest. Just south of the intersection with SH 276, FM 548 turns to the north, entering Royse City a few miles to the north. The highway intersects with I-30 before ending at SH 66 in downtown.

The first section of FM 548 ran from SH 205 near McLendon-Chisholm to US 67 (now SH 66) in downtown Royse City; this section was designated on July 9, 1945. On November 4, 1955, the section from FM 1143 west to then-FM 551 was transferred to FM 1143 (which became part of SH 276 on November 26, 1969) and the section from FM 550 to SH 205 was transferred to FM 550. FM 548 was rerouted over FM 1142 (which was cancelled as a result) from FM 1143 to SH 205. On May 25, 1962, the highway was extended further south to I-20 (now US 80) in Forney, replacing FM 2081. On January 26, 1986, the highway rerouted north of I-20. The routing between FM 740 and US 80 was transferred back to Kaufman County and the city of Forney. On October 29, 1998, FM 548 was extended southwest to FM 740 near the new route of I-20.

Junction list

FM 549

Farm to Market Road 549 (FM 549) is located in Rockwall County.

FM 549 runs from an intersection with FM 550/FM 740 in Heath to SH 205 in southern Rockwall. FM 549 has a short overlap with SH 205. The highway ends at an intersection with SH 276. In Heath the highway is known as Buffalo Way and Hubbard Road.

FM 549 was designated on July 9, 1945, from US 67 (this section was redesignated as part of FM 7 on July 16, 1957, and FM 7 was redesignated as SH 66 on November 30, 1961) to SH 205. On June 1, 1965, FM 549 was extended southwest to FM 740. On May 25, 1976, FM 549 was extended north to FM 552. On September 24, 2009, the section from I-30 to SH 276 was given to the city of Rockwall, so the section north of I-30 was renumbered FM 3549.

Junction list

FM 550

Farm to Market Road 550 (FM 550) is located in Rockwall County.

FM 550 begins at an intersection with FM 549/FM 740 in Heath. The highway runs east to McLendon-Chisholm where it intersects with SH 205. FM 550 runs north from SH 205 to its terminus at SH 276.

FM 550 was designated on July 9, 1945, from Rockwall, southward via Heath to SH 205. On November 4, 1955, the section north of FM 740 was transferred to FM 740, and FM 550 replaced a section of FM 548 northeast to FM 1143. On November 26, 1969, FM 1143 was cancelled and transferred to SH 276.

Junction list

FM 551

FM 552

FM 553

Farm to Market Road 553 (FM 553) is located in Freestone County. It runs from SH 179 to US 84 in eastern Teague.

FM 553 was designated on November 25, 1975, on the current route.

FM 553 (1945)

The first FM 553 was designated on July 13, 1945, from SH 154, 1 mile west of Gilmer, northwest to Enon. On November 23, 1948, the road was extended to Grice. On June 2, 1967, the road was extended northwest to FM 852. FM 553 was cancelled on June 19, 1967, and combined with FM 852. It was not signed as FM 852 until January 1, 1968.

FM 554

Farm to Market Road 554 (FM 554) is located in Ector County. It runs from SH 158 in Gardendale to Loop 338.

FM 554 was designated on October 26, 1983, on the current route.

FM 554 (1945)

The first FM 554 was designated on July 13, 1945, from SH 154 just west of Gilmer southwest to Latch. On November 20, 1961, the road was extended to FM 1002. FM 554 was cancelled on August 3, 1971, and transferred to FM 49 and FM 1795.

FM 555

FM 556

FM 557

FM 558

FM 559

Farm to Market Road 559 (FM 559) is located in the Texarkana metropolitan area. It is known locally as Richmond Road.

FM 559 begins at an intersection with SH 93 (Summerhill Road) just northwest of downtown Texarkana. The highway runs northwest along Richmond Road, passing just west of Texarkana College. FM 559 intersects Interstate 30/US 59 near Central Mall, running through a heavily developed area of northern Texarkana before entering the Pleasant Grove area of the city. The highway intersects Farm to Market Road 2878 (just south of Texas A&M University–Texarkana) and Farm to Market Road 989 before leaving the city. FM 559 intersects Farm to Market Road 1397 in Wamba before taking a more rural course. FM 559 ends a few miles north of FM 2253, continuing as a county road.

FM 559 originally ran further into Texarkana along 24th Street to US 82, with the north end in Wamba; this section was designated on July 9, 1945. The highway was then extended further north to County Road 2302 on December 17, 1952, where the road ends today. On September 30, 1970, the section of FM 559 along 24th Street was returned to the city of Texarkana as US 59 was re-routed west of the city. The section of FM 559 from SH 93 to FM 989 was redesignated Urban Road 559 (UR 559) on June 27, 1995. The designation of that segment reverted to FM 559 with the elimination of the Urban Road system on November 15, 2018.

Junction list

FM 560

FM 561

FM 562

Farm to Market Road 562 (FM 562) is located in Chambers County. It runs from SH 61/SH 65 south 10 miles, then southwest 15.9 miles to Smith Point.

FM 562 was designated on July 9, 1945, from the junction of SH 61 and SH 73T (now SH 65) south  to 2.6 miles south of Double Bayou. The only change was on January 27, 1950, when the road was extended southwest to Smith Point.

FM 563

FM 564
Farm to Market Road 564 (FM 564) is a designation that has been used twice. There is no highway currently using the FM 564 designation.

FM 564 (1945)

The original FM 564 was designated on July 9, 1945, from Anahuac south  to Scherer. On September 27, 1960, FM 564 was to be relocated to the road from SH 61 & FM 563 southward . Construction on the new road was completed by April 10, 1965, when FM 564 was removed from the state highway system; it is now Main Street. The new road that was to become new FM 564 became part of FM 563 instead.

FM 564 (1968)

The next use of the FM 564 designation was on July 11, 1968, from US 69 northwest of Mineola south to US 80. On February 1, 1973, the road was extended around the city back to its northern terminus, forming a loop. FM 564 was cancelled on March 25, 2010, and redesignated as Loop 564. Construction still has not been completed.

FM 565

Farm to Market Road 565 (FM 565) is located in Chambers County.

The road starts at SH 146 in Baytown and travels east. It intersects FM 1405 and SH 99 Toll near the Royal Purple Raceway. Next, it intersects FM 2354 and FM 3180. In Cove, it intersects FM 3246 and Interstate 10 (I-10). In Old River-Winfree,  it intersects FM 1409, and in Mont Belvieu, it intersects Loop 207 and ends at SH 146.

On November 23, 1948, it was extended from Old River-Winfree through Cove to Baytown at SH 146. FM 565's northern terminus was expanded from Loop 207 to SH 146 in Mont Belvieu in 2019.

Junction list

FM 566

Farm to Market Road 566 (FM 566) is located in Ellis County. It runs from US 77 in Milford to I-35E.

FM 566 was designated on May 6, 1964, on the current route.

FM 566 (1945)

The first FM 566 was designated on July 18, 1945, from US 67 in Valera south  to West Road 3.5 miles north of Voss. On July 15, 1949, the road was extended south  to Voss. On December 17, 1952, the road was extended south  to a road intersection. On September 27, 1960, the road was extended south to the Coleman-McCulloch county line. FM 566 was cancelled on October 14, 1960, and transferred to FM 503.

FM 567

FM 568

Farm to Market Road 568 (FM 568) is located in Coleman County. It runs from SH 206 in Coleman to an intersection with County Roads 127 and 134.

FM 568 was designated on July 18, 1945, from US 84, 2 miles southeast of Coleman, east  to an intersection with Echo Road. The route description was changed on August 4, 1945, to go from US 84 east and south . On January 27, 1948, the route was changed to go from US 84, 2.5 miles southeast of Coleman, east  . On November 23, 1948, the road was extended south to US 67/US 84 near Santa Anna. This section was renumbered as FM 1176 on April 13, 1949. On October 16, 1951, the road was extended east and northeast  to a road intersection, and extended northeast another  to a second road intersection on November 20, 1951. On October 24, 1955, the road was extended to SH 206, replacing Loop 175 (formerly SH 359).

FM 569

FM 570

FM 571

FM 572

FM 573

FM 574

FM 575

FM 576

FM 577

Farm to Market Road 577 (FM 577) is located in Washington County. It runs from SH 36 in the northwestern part of Brenham, east and southeast to US 290 in the southeastern part of the city, forming a partial loop. It is known locally as Gun and Rod Road and Blue Bell Road. Blue Bell Creameries is located on this road.

FM 577 was designated on October 31, 1957, from SH 36 (now Business SH 36) at Horton Street east to SH 90 (now SH 105). On June 28, 1963, the road was extended southeast to US 290. On July 25, 1993, the road was extended west to the current location of SH 36.

FM 577 (1945)

On November 23, 1948, the road was extended southeast , then southeast and east another  on July 15, 1949, and finally east  to FM 717 on September 15, 1955. FM 577 was cancelled on March 27, 1957, and transferred to FM 207.

FM 578

FM 579

Farm to Market Road 579 (FM 579) is a designation that has been used three times. The current use dates from 1979 in Leon County.

FM 579 was designated on September 26, 1979, from FM 1119, 2.5 miles southeast of FM 977, south to the Madison County line. On October 21, 1981, the road was extended south to SH OSR.

FM 579 (1945–1947)

The first use of the FM 579 designation was in Stephens County, from SH 67, 9 miles south of Breckenridge, east  to the Wayland/Necessity Road. FM 579 was cancelled on August 1, 1947, and mileage was used for an extension of FM 701.

FM 579 (1951–1968)

The second use of the FM 579 designation was in Floyd County on May 23, 1951, from US 62, 3 miles south of Floydada west  to a road intersection. On November 20, 1951, the road was extended west to FM 784 (now FM 378). A portion from FM 789 east to FM 378 was added on December 21, 1959, replacing a portion of FM 784 and creating a concurrency at FM 378. A section from FM 400 east to FM 789 was added on July 11, 1968, creating a concurrency at FM 789. FM 579 was cancelled on September 19, 1968, and combined with FM 37.

FM 580

FM 581

FM 582

Farm to Market Road 582 (FM 582) is located in Zavala County. It runs from FM 65 in Crystal City to FM 395. FM 582 is known locally as Lake Street, South 7th Avenue and Rock Quarry Road in Crystal City.

FM 582 was designated on October 31, 1958, from FM 65 at Crystal City east to FM 395 as a replacement of a section of FM 395 (which was rerouted on a new road to the south). On May 20, 1961, the road was extended east, north and west to FM 395. The final change was on August 1, 1962, when a section of FM 582 between FM 65 and FM 1433 was relocated to follow Lake Street, creating a concurrency with FM 1433.

FM 582 (1945)

The original FM 582 was designated on July 14, 1945, from US 190 in Lampasas northeast  to the Copperas Cove Road. On November 23, 1948, the road was extended northeast  to Rumley. On July 15, 1949, the road was extended northeast  to a road intersection near the Coryell County line. FM 582 was cancelled on March 27, 1957, and transferred to FM 580.

FM 583

RM 584

Ranch to Market Road 584 (RM 584) is located in Tom Green County.

RM 584 begins at an intersection with US 277 south of San Angelo. The highway runs west for approximately a mile before turning northwest. RM 584 passes near San Angelo Regional Airport before crossing Lake Nasworthy and entering the city limits of San Angelo. In San Angelo, RM 584 is known locally as Knickerbocker Road and runs through the city's south side. Between Lake Nasworthy and Loop 306, the highway runs by many subdivisions before passing a major retail center just north of Loop 306. North of Loop 306, RM 584 runs just south of Angelo State University before ending at an intersection with US 87/US 277.

The highway was designated on November 24, 1959, running from Loop 306 northeast to Avenue N in San Angelo. On June 28, 1963, the highway was extended southwest 4.9 miles. On November 26, 1969, RM 584's northern terminus was relocated from Avenue N to US 87 along Avenue Q and Knickerbocker Road. On May 25, 1976, the highway was extended southwestward and soutweastward to US 277. On June 27, 1995, the section of RM 584 from County Road 225 to US 87/US 277 was transferred to Urban Road 584 (UR 584). The designation reverted to RM 584 with the elimination of the Urban Road system on November 15, 2018.

Junction list

FM 584

FM 584 (1945–1951)

FM 584 was designated on July 16, 1945, from US 84 in Zephyr northeast  to a road near Dry Blanket Creek in Brown County. On May 23, 1951, the road was extended northeast  to the Comanche County line. FM 584 was cancelled on December 12, 1951, and became a portion of FM 590.

FM 585

Farm to Market Road 585 (FM 585) is located in Brown and Coleman counties.

The roadway travels to the north through unincorporated Brown County, intersecting  FM 2492 west of Thrifty and  FM 1850 west of Grosvenor. FM 585 then curves to the west and enters Coleman County before reaching its terminus at  SH 206 near the community of Echo between Coleman and Burkett.

FM 585 was designated on July 16, 1945. On October 26, 1954, the roadway was extended north to the intersection with FM 1850. The route reached its current length on May 24, 1962, when it was extended northward and westward to connect with SH 206, replacing FM 2560.

Junction list

FM 586

FM 587

FM 588

FM 589

FM 590

FM 591

FM 592

FM 593

FM 594

Farm to Market Road 594 (FM 594) is a designation that has been used four times. The current use is in Washington County, from FM 1948 northwest to Flat Prairie.

FM 594 (1945–1964)

The first use of FM 594 was in Hale County on July 9, 1945, from FM 54, 8 miles west of US 87, northward  to Cotton Center. A portion from US 70, 2 miles west of Halfway southward  to a road intersection was added on April 4, 1949, replacing FM 1069 and creating a gap. This gap was closed on November 20, 1951. FM 594 was cancelled on August 20, 1964, and transferred to FM 179.

FM 594 (1968)

The next use of the FM 594 designation was in Floyd County, from US 70 in Floydada east  along Price Street to SH 207. This second use was short-lived, as FM 594 was combined with FM 784 just three months later, though this FM 594 was not cancelled until it was built.

FM 594 (1972–1978)

The third use of the FM 594 designation was in Bell County, from US 190, 1 mile west of I-35, south and east two miles to I-35 at Loop 121. FM 594 was cancelled on October 11, 1978, and combined with Loop 121.

FM 595

FM 596

FM 597

FM 598

Farm to Market Road 598 (FM 598) is located in Kaufman County. It runs from FM 1392 southeast to SH 205 in Terrell. It was not opened until around 2011.

FM 598 (1945)

The first FM 598 was designated on July 21, 1945, from SH 86, 7 miles west of Silverton, south . Between May 7 and June 2, 1948, an  mile section from Lockney north to Lone Star School was added, replacing FM 787 and creating a gap. The northern portion was extended south  on July 14, 1949, and the gap was closed on December 17, 1952. On October 31, 1958, the road was extended to Loop 75 in Lockney. FM 598 was cancelled on December 21, 1959, and transferred to FM 378.

FM 599

Notes

References

+05
Farm to market roads 0500
Farm to Market Roads 0500